The Cayman Islands competed at the 2000 Summer Olympics in Sydney, Australia.

Results by event

Athletics
Men's Long Jump
 Kareem Streete-Thompson
 Qualifying – 7.99 (did not advance)

Women's 100m
 Cydonie Mothersille
 Round 1 – 11.38
 Round 2 – 11.81 (did not advance)

Women's 200m
 Cydonie Mothersille
 Round 1 – 22.78
 Round 2 – DNS (did not advance)

Sailing 
Women's Single Handed Dinghy (Europe)  
 Tomeka McTaggart
 Race 1 – (27) 
 Race 2 – (27) 
 Race 3 – 25  
 Race 4 – 25  
 Race 5 – 25  
 Race 6 – 23  
 Race 7 – 21  
 Race 8 – 22  
 Race 9 – 27  
 Race 10 – 25  
 Race 11 – 24  
 Final – 217 (26th place)

See also
Cayman Islands at the 1999 Pan American Games

References

Wallechinsky, David (2004). The Complete Book of the Summer Olympics (Athens 2004 Edition). Toronto, Canada. . 
International Olympic Committee (2001). The Results. Retrieved 12 November 2005.
Sydney Organising Committee for the Olympic Games (2001). Official Report of the XXVII Olympiad Volume 1: Preparing for the Games. Retrieved 20 November 2005.
Sydney Organising Committee for the Olympic Games (2001). Official Report of the XXVII Olympiad Volume 2: Celebrating the Games. Retrieved 20 November 2005.
Sydney Organising Committee for the Olympic Games (2001). The Results. Retrieved 20 November 2005.
International Olympic Committee Web Site
sports-reference

Nations at the 2000 Summer Olympics
2000
Olympics